Gurdwara (Sikh place of worship) Manji Sahib (also known as Alamgir Sahib) is located near the village of Alamgir, Ludhiana district, Punjab, India. Guru Gobind Singh, tenth guru of the Sikhs, stayed here for a short while. Upon reaching Alamgir, Guru Gobind Singh is reported to have shot an arrow into the ground; a spring appeared from that place (now known as Tirsar). He was also presented with a horse here by a devoted follower.

Gurdwara gallery

References

Gurdwaras in Punjab, India
Ludhiana district